Les Infournas (Vivaro-Alpine: Infornats) is a former commune in the Hautes-Alpes department in southeastern France. Since 2013 it is part of the commune Saint-Bonnet-en-Champsaur.

Population

See also
Communes of the Hautes-Alpes department

References

Former communes of Hautes-Alpes